Poenari may refer to several places in Romania:

 Poenari, a village in Ulmi Commune, Giurgiu County
 Poenari, a district in the city of Râmnicu Vâlcea, Vâlcea County
 Poenari Castle, Vlad III the Impaler's castle
 Poenari, a small handmade fountain pens factory in Romania.

See also

Poienari (disambiguation)